Tychowo  (formerly ) is a town in Białogard County, West Pomeranian Voivodeship, in north-western Poland. It is the seat of the gmina (administrative district) called Gmina Tychowo. It is located in the historic region of Pomerania.

Stalag Luft IV was located in the town during World War II.

The town has an approximate population of 2,500. It gained town status on 1 January 2010, and was the newest city in Poland as at July 2012.

History

Tychowo dates back to an early medieval Slavic settlement, which became part of the emerging Polish state in the 10th century. From the 12th century it was part of the Duchy of Pomerania, which split off from Poland as a result of the fragmentation of Poland into smaller duchies. The oldest known mention of the village comes from 1250. In the 15th century, the timber-framed church was built.

From 1701 the village was part of the Kingdom of Prussia, and from 1871 to 1945 it was part of Germany. During World War II the Germans established the Stalag Luft IV prisoner-of-war camp. The prisoners were mainly Americans, but also the British, Canadians, Russians, Poles, Australians, New Zealanders, South Africans, Czechs, French and one Norwegian. After the war the region became part of Poland again according to the post-war Potsdam Agreement.

Tychowo was granted town rights in 2010.

Sights
Among the town's landmarks are the 15th-century timber-framed church of Our Lady of Perpetual Help, a manor park, dating back to the 18th century and Trygław, i.e. the largest glacial erratic in Poland and one of the largest in Europe, listed as a natural monument.

Notable people 
 Karl Wilhelm von Kleist (1707-1766), German oberst
 Hans Jürgen von Kleist-Retzow (1771-1844), German politician
 Wolf Friedrich von Kleist-Retzow (1868-1933), German politician
 Darius Kaiser (born 1961) a Polish-born German racing cyclist

References

Cities and towns in West Pomeranian Voivodeship
Białogard County